Peter Harboe Castberg may refer to:

 Peter Hersleb Harboe Castberg (1794–1858), Norwegian priest and politician
 Peter Harboe Castberg (banker) (1844–1926), Norwegian banker